Cargo to Capetown is a 1950 American crime film noir directed by Earl McEvoy and starring Broderick Crawford, Ellen Drew and John Ireland. The film reunited the stars of All the King's Men, a major commercial and critical hit from the previous year.

The film's sets were designed by art director Cary Odell.

Plot
The captain of a rusty tanker fights his chief engineer for a woman on board.

Cast
 Broderick Crawford as Johnny Phelan  
 Ellen Drew as Kitty Mellar
 John Ireland as Steve Conway    
 Edgar Buchanan as Sam Bennett  
 Ted de Corsia as Rhys  
 Robert Espinoza as Rik 
 Leonard Strong as Singh

References

Bibliography
 Blottner, Gene. Columbia Noir: A Complete Filmography, 1940-1962. McFarland, 2015.

External links
 

1950 films
1950 crime drama films
American crime drama films
Columbia Pictures films
Seafaring films
American black-and-white films
Films directed by Earl McEvoy
1950s English-language films
1950s American films